The Muzikol Music Awards (commonly known as the MUMA)  is a music awards program developed by a technology company in Cameroon called ABEBOH and run by its Music product called Muzikol. The Main objective of Muzikol Music awards is to reward and celebrate outstanding performances in the African and Cameroonian Music Industries.Muzikol Music Awards is aimed at celebrating the African music Industry through the music,  the musicians and all the music professionals who make up the music industry.

Background 
Muzikol Music Awards was launched to give back recognition for well-deserved African music stakeholders free of bias and favors. The MUMAs do this by using Artificial Intelligence tools in the nominations process, voting system, and also in determining the final winners. In  2017, Nges Brian founded Muzikol which is a one-stop-shop for musical services and products and also a music social network to sell Cameroonian musical products and at the same time, connect the Musicians with friends and families. In 2020, Muzikol expanded its activities from online to offline by launching and executing the first edition of the Muzikol Music Awards in Douala - Cameroon which brought together thousands of music stakeholders from allover Cameroon

Structure 
Muzikol Music Awards is divided into two main types of categories namely statistics categories and voters categories. In the Statistics Categories, a panel of judges called the Nominations Committee selects the nominees through a grading process.  The nominees submit judging forms through the Awards portal and the final judging committee selects the final winners through a grading process. In the Voters Categories, the general public submits nominees through the online portal. The nominations committee selects the final nominees through a grading process. The winners for voters Categories come directly from the web portal using votes.

First MUMA (MUMA 2020) 
MUMA 2020 was a celebrated program for music stakeholders in Cameroon and across Africa. Burna Boy, Wizkid, Eddy Kenzo, Shatta Wale, Rudeboy and many others were the nominees for MUMA 2020.

MUMA2020 Winners

References

External links

Awards established in 2020
African music awards